Knik may refer to the following entities in Alaska:

Landforms and natural phenomena
 Knik Arm, the northernmost extension of Cook Inlet
 Knik Glacier, a glacier in the Chugach Mountains
 Knik River, which runs from Knik Glacier to Knik Arm
 Knik wind

Media
 KMVN, a radio station at 105.7 FM, licensed to Anchorage, known by the call letters KNIK-FM from 1961 to 2009
 KNIK-LP, a low-power television station on channel 6, licensed to Anchorage
 Knik TV Mast, a guyed mast located between Anchorage and Wasilla which transmits multiple Anchorage-area radio and television stations

Populated places in Matanuska-Susitna Borough
 Knik-Fairview, Alaska, a census-designated place (CDP) south of Wasilla
 Knik River, Alaska, a CDP southeast of Butte and Palmer
 Knik Site (Old Knik), a former settlement and museum listed on the National Register of Historic Places

Proposed development projects
 Knik Arm Bridge, a proposal for a bridge across Knik Arm
 Knik Arm ferry, a proposal to make the same crossing of Knik Arm with a ferry

Other
 Knik Tribal Council, see